Leong Chon Kit (born 6 June 1980) is a Macau international footballer who plays as a goalkeeper for PSP Macau in the Liga de Elite.

References 

1980 births
Living people
Macau footballers
Macau international footballers
Association football goalkeepers